Jalan Tasek Alai (Johor state route J153) is a main state road in Johor which is one of the 13 states in Malaysia. It acts as the main bypass of Segamat town centre for travelers from southwestern towns and cities such as Muar, Batu Pahat and Melaka who travel to east coastal states via the Tun Razak Highway (route J12) and vice versa.

List of junctions

Roads in Johor